Carsten Bachke (born 14 October 1963) is a retired Norwegian football midfielder. He joined Moss FK from Ekholt BK ahead of the 1985 season. Following a career where he won the Norwegian league in 1987 and was capped 6 times for Norway, he retired after the 1990 season.

References

1963 births
Living people
Norwegian footballers
People from Rygge
Moss FK players
Eliteserien players
Norwegian First Division players

Association football midfielders
Norway international footballers
Sportspeople from Viken (county)